The Hove amber cup is a Bronze Age cup that was discovered in a great round barrow mound that was crudely excavated in 1856, in Hove, East Sussex, England, and is now in Hove Museum and Art Gallery. It was found during the construction of Palmeira Square.  The barrow was of exceptional size and quality, suggesting a date in the mid-Bronze Age. The Hove amber cup is one of only two found in Britain; the other was in Dorset. However, the two are not of the same style of craftsmanship.

Dated to c. 1750-1550 BCE, the amber cup was found in a Wessex culture grave in a coffin made from a treetrunk. Also in the coffin were a skeleton, a Camerton (Wessex culture) type dagger, a whetstone and a small axe.

It has been associated with a small group of other "unstable" cups with round bottoms, made of precious materials and found in north-western Europe.  Most are in gold, but also silver, amber and shale. The Ringlemere Cup and Rillaton Cup are the two British gold cups.  The amber would have come from the Baltic region, and the group suggest early trade links between Britain and Europe.

Construction 
The cup is made from a single piece of amber, and this suggests trading links between this part of Britain and the Baltic regions where such amber was extracted.

Original account
According to the original description by Barclay Philips,

Notes

References
"BMRP": The Ringlemere Cup: Precious Cups and the Beginning of the Channel Bronze Age - available online, Editors: Stuart Needham, Keith Parfitt and Gillian Varndell; Contributors: Aaron Birchenough, Chris Butler, Caroline Cartwright, Stuart Needham, Susan La Niece, Keith Parfitt, Gillian Varndell, British Museum Research Publication 163,

External links
 A Brief Human History of Amber

Archaeological artifacts
Bronze Age England
History of Brighton and Hove
Bronze Age art
Archaeological discoveries in the United Kingdom
1856 in England
1856 archaeological discoveries
Hove